VGC may refer to:

 Valenzuela Gateway Complex
 Video Graphics Controller
 Video Games Chronicle, a website partnered with Gamer Network
 Flemish Community Commission (Vlaamse Gemeenschapscommissie)
 Volkswagen Group China
 Pokemon Video Game Championships, see